Hugh Baird (27 December 1911 – 18 July 1965) was an Australian cricketer. He played one first-class match for Western Australia in 1929/30.

References

External links
 

1911 births
1965 deaths
Australian cricketers
Western Australia cricketers
Cricketers from Perth, Western Australia